Rachel McDougall Jenkins  (born 17 April 1949) is a professor of epidemiology and international mental health policy at the Institute of Psychiatry, King's College London, director of the World Health Organization (WHO) Collaborating Centre and a visiting professor at the London School of Hygiene & Tropical Medicine.
She was educated at Haberdashers' Monmouth School for Girls, St Paul's Girls' School and Girton College, Cambridge.

In 2005 to 2011, Jenkins led the WHO programme enabling primary care workers to provide mental healthcare in Kenya, with the outcome that 1,677 primary care workers and 195 medical supervisory staff received training. She is a member of the editorial board of the International Journal of Mental Health Systems.

Jenkins was appointed Officer of the Order of the British Empire (OBE) in the 2023 New Year Honours for services to mental health policy and research in the UK and overseas.

Selected publications

References

Academics of King's College London
British women academics
1949 births
People educated at St Paul's Girls' School
People educated at Haberdashers' Monmouth School for Girls
Alumni of Girton College, Cambridge
British public health doctors
Living people
British women psychiatrists
Women public health doctors
Officers of the Order of the British Empire
British women epidemiologists